Springs is a former independent city that is now part of the City of Ekurhuleni, based in the east of Johannesburg (East Rand), in Gauteng Province, South Africa. It lies 50 km (31 mi) east of Johannesburg and 72 km (45 mi) southeast from Pretoria. Its name derives from the large number of springs in the area, and its estimated population is more than 121,610 in 2011. It is situated at 1628 m (5,340 ft) above sea level.

Springs was divided during the Apartheid era into the middle- and upper-income white suburbs around the city centre and the Indian area of Bakerton east of the CBD; while black people were relocated to KwaThema, southwest of the CBD.

History

The town of Springs, east of Johannesburg, is on the East Rand, or what is now known as the Metropolitan area of Ekurhuleni, in the Gauteng Province. It was founded as a coal and gold mining town in 1904, but its history can be traced back to the second half of the 19th century.

From about 1840 farmers moved into the area and declared farms for themselves, especially after the Zuid-Afrikaansche Republiek (South African Republic, later Transvaal) became an independent republic with the signing of the Sand River Convention in 1852. These initial farms were large, but the measurements of the borders were inaccurate and later, when the correct borders of the farms had to be documented, there were several extra or odd pieces of land that did not belong to any farm. These odd pieces of land then became state property. Such an odd piece existed between three neighbouring farms on the Witwatersrand, namely Geduld (meaning 'patience'), De Rietfontein ('the reed fountain') and Brakpan (literally, 'small, brackish lake').

The 685 ha odd piece was given the name 'The Springs' by the land surveyor James Brooks, probably because of all the fountains on the land. Another story is that he wanted to name it after himself, but because his name (Brooks) resembled the Afrikaans word 'broek' (trousers) so closely, he feared that the Afrikaans farmers in the area would mock it.

On 16 September 1884 the official map of The Springs was registered in Pretoria, the Republic's capital. Initially, the land's value was equal to R200. But the discovery of coal and gold and its subsequent mining increased the value considerably.

The coal discovered in The Springs was of a good quality and in 1888 the first contract was signed to mine coal there. Initially mining was on a small scale, but rose when the Great Eastern mine was established. There were a number of corrugated iron houses around the mine and, although there was a few small hotels and general dealers, it was not a town yet. The settlement grew and in 1902 a health committee was appointed to look after the building and location of structures and also the hygiene in the growing township. In 1904 the Grootvlei Proprietary Mines were registered and shafts were sunk. This followed the discovery in 1899 of gold on the farm Geduld and the further discovery of the main reef in 1902.

In April 1904, The Springs was proclaimed a town, called Springs, the health committee replaced by a town council, and it flourished as a mining town. In 1962, Springs produced 10% of the country's gold and 9% of its uranium. However, by the end of the 1960s the last mine in town, the Daggafonteinmyn, (literally: Marijuana fountain mine) was emptied. The town did not die, but instead developed into an industrial centre.

The original 7 km2 farm on which the city of Springs was later to be built, The Springs, was surveyed in 1883. Coal was discovered in the area in 1887 and three years later in 1890–1891, the Transvaal Republic's first railway, the Randtram Line, was built by the Netherlands-South African Railway Company (NZASM) to carry coal from the East Rand coalfields to the gold mines of the Witwatersrand.

Gradually, especially after coal was discovered further east in South Africa in Witbank, the Springs collieries were closed. In the meanwhile, however, gold had also been discovered in the area. A village was laid out in 1904 and in 1908 the first gold mining began. Springs was granted municipal status in 1912. By the late 1930s, there were eight gold mines near Springs, making it the largest single gold-producing area in the world.

Springs is currently one of the industrial centers of the Witwatersrand and also the Eastern Gateway of Gauteng towards Mpumalanga and Northern Kwazulu Natal. Mining has been replaced by manufacturing and engineering industries of economic importance; products of the region include processed metals, chemicals, paper and foodstuffs.

Geography

Communities

Although Springs is a highly industrial city, its suburbs are treelike with many parks and also giving some suburban character. The following are the main suburbs of Springs:

 Modder East (Eastvale)
 Dersley
 Presidents Dam
 Presidents Ranch
 Krugersrus
 New State Era
 Krugersrus Ext
 Rowhill
 Petersfield
 Petersfield Ext
 Paul Krugersoord
 East Geduld
 Geduld
 Geduld Ext
 Springs Ext
 Springs CBD
 Lodeyko
 Welgedag
 Holfontein
 Persida
 Welgedag Small Holdings
 Everest
 Gugulethu
 Slovo Park
 Slovo Park East
 Bakerton
 Strubenvale
 Strubenvale Ext
 Grootvlei
 Great Valley
 Casseldale
 Palmiet Kuil
 Largo
 Aston Lake
 Edelweiss
 Edelweiss Ext
 Daggafontein
 Daggafontein Ext
 Selection Park North
 Selection Park South
 Selcourt
 Struisbult
 Pollak Park
 Wright Park
 Reedville
 Dal Fouche
 KwaThema
 Payneville

Architecture and monuments

Today, Springs is well known for its architecture: it has the second largest collection of small scale Art Deco buildings in the world, after Miami in Florida, in the United States. These Art Deco buildings were constructed during the period between the two World Wars. Other landmarks include several monuments to important figures in the city's development, like Paul Kruger, and the war cemetery where many Coloured soldiers are buried who died during the Second World War fighting in the Allied Forces. There is also the War Monument at the northern entrance of the Springs CBD, The Old Springs Fire Station, and the Dutch Windmill in the Pioneer Park, Springs. There is a small scale replica of the Voortrekker Monument in the Springs CBD near the library. 
Springs has an art gallery next to the Springs Library. At the entrance of the Springs Railway station there is an old orange tree planted by the Dutch people when Queen Wilhelmina of the Netherlands visited the old South African Republic accompanied by the then South African president Paul Kruger.

Many theatrical productions are performed at the Springs Civic Theater. The Springs Civic Centre and City Hall is also a unique building complex as it rested on hey logs with water underneath

The Springs Mall, which serves the town is opened from 6:00 am-20:00/22:00

The Springs Fire Station is also one of the Art Deco Buildings as seen from the Boksburg Road towards Downtown Springs.

There is also the Mudhook Hall opposite the Springs Civic Center. That Hall is being built in honor of the M.O.T.H., which stands for the Members of the Order of the Tin Hat Soldiers who fought during world war two. It is also an Art Deco building and overlooking the Down Town Springs from the Western Side

Climate 
Springs has a typical sub-tropical climate with four distinct seasons. The summers are hot with afternoon thunder showers in early summers and drier during January and February which are the two hottest months. The winters are very cold with severe frost and very occasional snow, the coldest months being July and August although June is also very cold. August is usually a very windy month continuing into early spring of September with sandstorms and strong winds. Spring is warm to hot with some afternoon showers. Spring usually starts to show during the latter half of August although it is officially springtime from September. The autumns are generally cooler, starting with late rains in the beginning of autumn and getting colder towards winter with the first frost in late autumn. At times the first signs of autumn can be seen in late February. The average highs during the summers are 32 °C (90 °F) although it can go as high as 37 °C (99 °F). A record high of 40 °C (104 °F) has been recorded. Average winter temperatures are around 10 °C (50 °F) and the average lows during the summer months are 15 °C (59 °F) and – 5 °C (23 °F) during the winter months. Temperatures can drop to – 10 °C (14 °F) and a record low of −15 °C (5 °F) has been recorded. The average rainfall in Springs is 450 mm (18 inches) per annum.

Fauna and flora 
Springs has a Highveld grassland vegetation, which is the general vegetation type of the Highveld which consists of the southern half of Gauteng, Western Mpumalanga, South Eastern parts of the Limpopo province, most of the Freestate, Northern Eastern Cape and South Eastern parts of Northwest and Eastern Northern Cape.

Springs is mostly grassland with short grass with some smaller succulent plants such as the aloe. The plough-breaker which is unique on the Highveld with most part of the plant in the soil can also be found. The wetland areas in Springs has an area of 17 km2 (6.6 mi2) fed by the Blesbokspruit and Lesser Blesbokspruit, with concomitant water plants and trees growing nearby.

The Blesbokspruit Wetland Region in Springs draws over 300 species of birds, including the great flamingo, Egyptian Goose, barn owl, blue crane, guineafowl, secretary-bird and the ostrich. Water mammals such as the otter and lesser otter have been observed in less populated areas. The blesbok, mongoose, reed buck, read jackal, black wildebeest, springbok, mountain zebra, the porcupine and other mammals are to be found, but usually within reserve areas.

Various species of reptiles such as the rinkhals, puffadder brown house snake, aurora house snake and various lizards, including the giant girdled lizard, and the African bullfrog are also to be found in wetland areas of Springs.

Demographics

Jewish community
Up until the late 1990s Springs had a vibrant Jewish community.  There were two synagogues, with a total of 300 families. Today (2015) most of the community has left for Johannesburg, Cape Town, or further afield like Israel, Australia, the US and the UK.

Economy
Springs as a city is an economic hub in Ekurhuleni with a diverse economy, ranging from manufacturing, commerce, service, hospitality, mining and service providing companies.

Mining 
Historically, Springs was known as a mining centre for two major types of minerals (gold and coal). Springs is still one of the gold mining centers in South Africa, which includes Gold One, Modder East Operation, the Geduld Mine and East Geduld Mine and also the Daggafontein and East Daggafontein mines. Besides gold, new coal mines towards the east of the city are being developed.

Manufacturing 
Springs is one of the industrial centres in Gauteng served by four industrial suburbs, which are New Era, Nuffield, Enstra and Fulcrum with smaller industrial areas at Dersley, suburb of Springs, Daggafontein, Selection Park, Selcourt and Strubenvale. There are a couple of manufacturing companies in Springs. The only Kelloggs factory in South Africa is situated in Springs. Springs is also home to Impala Platinum's precious and base metal refineries as well as PFG Building Glass Building Glass, the only producer of float glass on the continent. 

Zincor, the only zinc producer in Africa, was also located here; its refinery used to produce all South Africa's requirement of this metal and ceased its production operations in 2011 due to various economic reasons.  Springs is home to Sappi Enstra Mill, the only paper mill plant of Southern Africa, only paper mill plant in the world that is not next to a river, Element Six Ultra High, an industry in industrial diamonds and beverage cans, manufacturing of cans and Kimberly-Clark in Enstra manufacturing toilet paper, tissues, serviettes and other products. Afrox Healthcare has a plant in Enstra, Springs specializing in health care products. Then there is also Liebherr Group Africa specialising in heavy construction vehicles, McCain Foods packaging plant in Nuffield, Corobrik Plant near Selcourt specialising in bricks and Kreepy Krauly swimming pool equipment and regulator system manufacturing plant in Nuffield Springs. Mondi Group also have the cartonboard plant and recycling plant in New Era and Sony Ericson phone manufacturing plant also in New Era. There is also the Cobra Water Tap in New Era.  

There is also the Angelo Kater Motor Trimmers Conversion plant in Nuffield Springs specialising in vehicle conversions for Taxis, ambulances, police vehicles and other emergency vehicles in Nuffield, Springs. Springs is home to Jachris pty limited, a hose and coupling manufacturer that supplies most of Southern Africas mining houses. Various scrap metal recyclers like GSMP - Golden Scrap Metal Processors and Jimmy Scrap Metals also find their homes in Springs.

Transportation 
Springs is also a transporting centre with many transporting companies. Some of the more known companies include Van Heerden's Trucking company in Largo, an eastern suburb of Springs and Penta Trucking focusing on cargo transporting from Nuffield, Springs. Welthagen Transport in New Era specialises in bulk and container shipping and the Amalgamating Bulk carrier company from Welgedag, Springs concentrates on bulk transporting.

Retailing 

Springs has a well developed CBD with a couple of highrise office buildings such as the 18-story Checktown building housing the regional office of Telkom for Gauteng and head office for the trading section and Marketing of Telkom, the 12-story Standard Bank building which has been standing empty for a number of years, the 14-story Nongai building that is undergoing restoration and the 13-story Seedfam Towers and also a 14-story Everest Apartment complex.

Shopping centres 
There are two major shopping malls in the Springs Downtown serving Springs, The Avenues and Palm Springs, as well as Veranda Shopping Centre and the Third Street Arcade, Seedfam Tower Arcade, Standard Band Arcade and a newer arcade in Third Street too and the Second Street Mall near the Springs Railway Station. There are a number of shopping centres in the suburbs of Springs such as the Selcourt Shopping Center, Strubenvale Shopping Centre, New State Era Shopping Centre, Bakerton Square and also the newer shopping centres like Springsgate and Selcourt Towers and many more shopping centers in Springs and the suburbs. A new regional mall, Springs Mall has opened recently on Wit Road at the N17 onramp. It gives the area 50000 m2 of premium retail shopping.

Other businesses 
Service delivery business is also very strong in Springs. Many of them are focusing on business development, consultancy and business solutions in the city. Others are construction businesses and property development. There are also many financial services like the Financial consultancies, auditors and accountants in the city and legal services and property agencies. Acupack Solution, a packaging machine manufacturing company, is based in New Era.

There are many restaurants in Springs and catering services and events managements business in the city. Hospitality is also strong as there are many guesthouses in the city and around the city. The Stable Inn is the best known in Springs. Springs is also well served by Takeaway businesses

Sports
At Presidents Park there are many horse jumping tournaments that take place. Springs has two golf courses, the Springs Country Club in Selection Park, and the Pollock Park Country Club.

Parks and greenspaces

Parks
Springs has about 120 parks, the most well-known being Presidents Park, where there is horse jumping, and Murray Park, which has a caravan site next to the Alexander Dam. There is also Frikkie Deysel Park in Petersfield, Butler Park in Geduld, George Sutter Park in Selection Park, and the Park of Dersley in Dersley Park. In Northeastern Springs, the Blesbokspruit Wetland Reserve has a great diversity of birds and plants. Springs also has a Game Reserve near the CBD and the unique Pioneer Park with Dutch characteristics next to the Springs CBD.

Education
There are several schools, ranging from pre-primary to secondary schools, and a tertiary college in Springs.

Primary

 Bakerton Primary School
 Creative Education Centre (Nursery and Primary School)
 Job Maseko Primary School
 KwaThema Primary School
 Laerskool Christiaan Beyers
 Laerskool Jan van Riebeeck
 Laerskool Morester
 Laerskool PAM Brink
 Laerskool Selection Park
 Laerskool Welgedag
 Laerskool Werda
 Montessori School (nursery and grades 1–3)
 Pinegrove Primary School
 PLG Springs Academy (Pre-Primary and Primary School) 
 Selcourt Primary School
 Selpark Primary School
 Strubenvale Primary School
 Umbila Primary Farm School
 Veritas College Preparatory School
 Vukucinge Primary Farm School
 Zithembeni Primary School

Secondary
 Eureka High School
 Hoërskool Dr Johan Jurgens High School
 Hoer Tegniese Skool Springs
 Hoerskool Hugenote
 Jameson High School
 Springs Boys' High School
 Springs Girls' High School
 Springs Secondary School
 Veritas College – Springs
 The Keep Learning Centre

Further and higher
 Ekurhuleni East College, Springs Campus

Combined
Combined schools offer primary and secondary, and sometimes pre-primary reception.
 Olympia Park School
 Dr. WK. Du Plessis School
 Phelang
 Protea School
 Springs Muslim School
 Veritas College
 PLG Springs Academy

Media
Springs is served very well by the media. There are local newspapers that operate from Springs. The Springs Advertiser covers the whole of the greater Springs area, including KwaThema. Then there is also the African Reporter that covers KwaThema, Tsakane in Brakpan and Duduza. Springs is also served by a local radio station, the East Rand Stereo on a frequency of 93.9 FM Stereo, covering the whole of Ekurhuleni Metro, eastern parts of Johannesburg, Heidelberg, Delmas, Secunda in Mpumalanga, Leandra, and Devon in Eastern Gauteng, with over 300,000 listeners. East Rand Stereo operates from the headquarters in Springs, following some satellite studios that had been opened in Brakpan, Benoni and Boksburg. The video production company Black Light Productions was launched in Dersley, a tranquil suburb of Springs. They are specialists and experts in corporate video and video marketing. Since, Black Light Productions has moved in Sandton.

Infrastructure
Springs is served by a very good transportation system, by both road and rail and is also close to the OR Tambo International Airport in Kempton Park via the N12 and R21.

Transportation

Road transportation 
Springs is served by two national highways. The N12 is an east/west freeway, connecting Springs with Witbank to the east and with Johannesburg in the west. The N17 is also an east/west freeway, but connects Springs with Ermelo in the east and Johannesburg in the west. Springs is also served by four regional routes, the R29, R51, R554 and the R555. The R29 is an east/west regional route which connects Springs with Benoni northwest of Springs and with Leandra in the east. The north–south R51 which connects Springs with Pretoria in the north and with Nigel, Balfour and Villiers in the south. The R554 with its terminal at the R51 route near the Springs CBD which connects Springs with Alberton and the southern suburbs of Johannesburg and the R555 with its terminal at the R29 at the War Monument at the northern entrance of Downtown Springs to the northeast that connects Springs with Delmas, Witbank and Middelburg. Springs is also connected with Brakpan through the M46 and Heidelberg via the R42 that runs into the R51 is connected to Springs too.

Railway transportation 

Springs is also a major railway hub. Springs is a subhub for the Metrorail Gauteng with the Springs-Johannesburg trains serving Springs, Brakpan, Benoni, Boksburg, Germiston and Johannesburg. Springs also have the Springs Nigel Line serving Springs and Nigel. Springs is also a major hub for Transnet Freight Rail with goods and cargo carriers trains from the Springs, Welgedag and Daggafontein stations connecting Springs with Johannesburg, Ermelo, Witbank, Nelspruit, Pretoria, Vereeniging, Klerksdorp, Richards Bay, Durban, Bloemfontein, Pietersburg, Lesotho and Rustenburg. Coal and wood is transported with petroleum and ammonia and cement. Springs is also served by the container services through rail and road,

Health Systems
Springs is served by the Far East Rand provincial Hospital and three private hospitals, the N17 Hospital, the St Mary Women's Hospital and the Parkland Hospital closer to the Springs CBD.   Springs has many clinics, including the White City and KwaThema clinics in KwaThema, Painville clinic and the newly built Springs clinic operated under the Springs Service Delivery as a municipal clinic under Ekurhuleni Metropolitan Council.  Then there are many private clinics, some of them under Medi Clinic and  physiotherapist clinics, occupational therapist clinics and also specialist doctors consultancy offices in Springs and the Medical laboratory at the Parklands Hospital, Springs.

Notable people
Important and well-known people who were born or lived in Springs include Nobel laureate in Literature Nadine Gordimer and Olympic swimming gold medallist Penny Heyns.
Other famous people who are associated with Springs include:
Brandon Auret (born 27 December 1972), a well-known actor on stage (Winnie), television (Isidingo, Angel's Song, One Way, Breathe), and film (Catch a Fire, Hansie – The Movie, District 9, Night Drive, The Race-ist, Elysium), rock singer, and songwriter, was born and raised in Springs and attended the local CBC (now Veritas College).
Ernest George Bock (17 September 1908 – 5 September 1961), a South African cricket player in one test (1935/ 1936), who once held one of the top Currie Cup bowling averages and was also a Griqualand West cricket and rugby player, relocated from Kimberley, Northern Cape, to Springs.
Rudi Bryson (born 25 July 1968), a former South African cricketer who played seven One Day Internationals in 1997, and played for Northern Transvaal and Eastern Province cricket teams, was born and raised in Springs, and attended Springs Boys' High School.
Roger Joyce Bushell, RAF (30 August 1910 – 29 March 1944), a Springs-born British lawyer and Auxiliary Air Force pilot, organised and led the famous escape from the Nazi prisoner of war camp, Stalag Luft III in 1944.
Ferdinand Chauvier (d.1985), a hydraulics engineer from the Belgian Congo who moved to Springs in 1951, invented the first automated pool cleaner.
Fiona Coyne (22 June 1965 – 18 August 2010), a well-known theatre actress, playwright, writer, and television presenter (The Weakest Link, South Africa), was born, raised, and married in Springs, and attended the Springs Convent school (now Veritas College).
Koos du Plessis (10 May 1945 – 15 January 1984), a prominent South African singer-songwriter and poet, was born in Rustenburg, and grew up in Springs, attending PAM Brink Primary School and High School Hugenote.
Angelique Gerber (born 16 April 1983), well known South African actress.
Nadine Gordimer (20 November 1923 - 13 July 2014), the first South African Nobel Laureate in Literature (1991) and recipient of the 1974 Booker Prize, was born in Springs and attended the local Our Lady of Mercy Convent school (now known as Veritas College).
Dean Hall (born 2 September 1977), a former Springbok rugby, Lions rugby, and Sharks rugby player (winger), and once dubbed "the white Jonah Lomu" by the New Zealand media, was born and raised in Springs and attended Springs Boys' High School.
Penny Heyns (born 8 November 1974), double Olympic gold medallist in swimming (1996 Atlanta Olympic Games), holder of 14 swimming world records, and the only woman in history to complete the Olympic double of winning both the 100 and 200-metre breaststroke, was born in Springs and attended a local primary school.
Job Maseko (died 7 March 1952), World War II prisoner of war and namesake of the Job Maseko Primary School in KwaThema, Springs. He was a member of the Native Military Corps and was awarded the Military Medal for sinking an enemy steamer that was moored in Tobruk Harbour.
Frew McMillan (born 20 May 1942), former world tennis player and tennis commentator was born in Springs.
Madi Phala (2 February 1955 – 2 March 2007), well-known artist, designer, and educator, was born and raised in KwaThema, Springs.
James Phillips (22 January 1959 – 31 July 1995), a South African rock singer, songwriter and performer, grew up in Springs.
 Gavin Ramsay (1963 - 4 February 2017), five-time South African motorcycling champion, spent his life in Springs.
Justine Robbeson (born 15 May 1985), former world junior heptathlon champion (2004), current African record holder in the women's javelin (63.49m in February 2008), and participant in the 2008 Beijing Olympic Games, grew up in Springs and attended Springs Girls' High School.
 Tony Schiena (born 4 December), an Undefeated World Karate Champion, former intelligence operative, founder and CEO of defense intelligence agency MOSAIC and action movie star most recognizable for the cult hit "DARC".
Lawrence Sephaka (born 8 August 1978), a Springbok rugby player (prop) from 2001 to 2006 gaining 24 caps and playing in the 2003 Rugby World Cup, former Lions rugby player, and current professional player for Rugby Pro D2, the second level of the French professional league, for Toulon, attended Hoer Tegniese Skool in Springs.
Eudy Simelane (11 March 1977 – 28 April 2008), a well-known former South Africa women's national football team ("Banyana Banyana") midfielder, future South African Football Association referee, and gay rights activist grew up in and was murdered in KwaThema, Springs.
Haydn Smith (born 1973), cricketer
Glenda Steyn (born 2 January 1964), notable liberal politician from the Democratic Party (now Democratic Alliance), grew up in Springs and is now a DA Member of the Gauteng Provincial Legislature, spokesperson on the Standing Committee on Public Accounts, former Chief Whip, as well as a former Provincial Chairperson of the Democratic Alliance.
Shirley Sutherland (born 17 December 1973), a well-known coloratura soprano opera singer, director, and performer in musicals, grew up in Springs and attended Springs Girls' High School.
Andre Viljoen, former president and CEO of South African Airways (SAA) (2001–2004), grew up in Springs and attended Springs Boys' High School.
Rolly Xipu (born 12 January 1952), grew up in Payneville and was a South African boxer, who fought from 1972 to 1981. Xipu held the South African lightweight title.

References

External links
Springs Personal Website
Ekurhuleni Official Website
History
KwaThema
Springs Map

 
East Rand
Populated places in Ekurhuleni
Populated places established in 1904